Julia Fox is an author and historical researcher, and a former teacher. She lives in London with her husband, the Tudor historian, John Guy. Her first book was Jane Boleyn: The Infamous Lady Rochford, a study of the lady-in-waiting at the court of Henry VIII of England and the sister-in-law of Anne Boleyn. Her second book, Sister Queens, is a biography of sisters Katherine of Aragon, who was Henry VIII's first wife, and Joanna of Castile, who was the mother of Charles V, Holy Roman Emperor.

Works
Jane Boleyn: The Infamous Lady Rochford (Weidenfeld & Nicolson, 2007); published in the U.S. as Jane Boleyn: The True Story of the Infamous Lady Rochford (Ballantine Books, 2007).
Sister Queens: Katherine of Aragon and Juana, Queen of Castile (Weidenfeld & Nicolson, 2011); published in the U.S. as Sister Queens: The Noble, Tragic Lives of Katherine of Aragon and Juana, Queen of Castile (Ballantine Books, 2011).

References

External links
 Julia Fox's official website

British historians
Living people
British women historians
British women non-fiction writers
Year of birth missing (living people)